Kelly Graeme Evernden (born 21 September 1961) is a former professional tennis player from New Zealand.

Evernden turned professional in 1985 and won his first tour doubles title in 1986 at Cologne. His first top-level singles title came in 1987 at Bristol. His best singles performance at a Grand Slam event came at the 1987 Australian Open, where he reached the quarter-finals by defeating Jonathan Canter, Johan Kriek, Brad Pearce and Derrick Rostagno before being knocked-out by Wally Masur. Evernden represented New Zealand at the 1988 Olympic Games in Seoul.

Over the course of his career, Evernden won three top-level singles titles, the last of which was won in 1989 at Wellington. He also won five tour doubles titles (the most significant of which was the Canadian Open in 1989). Evernden's career-high rankings were world No. 31 in singles and world No. 19 in doubles. He retired from the professional tour in 1994.

Evernden played pro tennis with only one lung, having had a lung removed as the result of an injury sustained in an accident at the age of 16. He was hit by a car and his heart stopped twice in five days (once for one minute and once for 45 seconds). In addition to puncturing a lung which had to be removed, he also had a broken arm, leg and ribs, however he recovered fully from the accident.

He lives on Mercer Island with his wife and two sons.

Prior to turning professional, Evernden played tennis for the University of Arkansas (where he studied business management and psychology) and was an All-American in 1984.

Evernden is a quarter Ngāti Porou Māori, and his Māori name "Te Rangai" means "Young Warrior". His Irish name, Kelly, means "War".

ATP career finals

Singles: 7 (3 titles, 4 runner-ups)

Doubles: 8 (5 titles, 3 runner-ups)

ATP Challenger and ITF Futures finals

Singles: 1 (0–1)

Doubles: 1 (0–1)

Performance timelines

Singles

Doubles

Mixed Doubles

References

External links 
 
 
 

1961 births
Living people
Arkansas Razorbacks men's tennis players
Hopman Cup competitors
New Zealand expatriate sportspeople in the United States
New Zealand male tennis players
Olympic tennis players of New Zealand
Sportspeople from Gisborne, New Zealand
Tennis players at the 1988 Summer Olympics